RBAF may refer to:

Royal Brunei Air Force
Royal Brunei Armed Forces
Royal Bahraini Air Force